Oliver Prince Smith (October 26, 1893 – December 25, 1977) was a U.S. Marine four star general and decorated combat veteran of World War II and the Korean War.  He is most noted for commanding the 1st Marine Division during the first year of the Korean War, and notably during the Battle of Chosin Reservoir, where he said "Retreat, hell! We're not retreating, we're just advancing in a different direction." He retired at the rank of four-star general, being advanced in rank for having been specially commended for heroism in combat.

Military career

Early years
Smith was born in Menard, Texas. His father died when he was seven, and his mother moved to Northern California. He graduated from Santa Cruz High School in 1911. He attended the University of California, Berkeley, working his way through college doing odd jobs (mostly gardening). After graduation, he reported for active duty as a second lieutenant in the Marine Corps in 1917. Smith was a quiet, shy Christian Scientist.

The following month he was assigned his first overseas tour at Guam, Marianas Islands, where he served with the Marine Barracks, Naval Station. While in Guam, (then) Lieutenant Smith was married to Esther Laurilla King of Hayward, California.  They remained married for 58 years. In May 1919, he returned to the United States for duty with the Marine barracks at Mare Island, California.

Ordered to sea duty in October 1921, Lieutenant Smith served as commanding officer of the Marine Detachment aboard the  until May 1924. At that time he was assigned to Marine Corps Headquarters, Washington, D.C., for duty with the personnel section.

Returning overseas in June 1928, he joined the Gendarmerie of Haiti, Port-au-Prince, as assistant chief of staff. Following his return from foreign shore duty in June 1931, he became a student at the Field Officer's Course, U.S. Army Infantry School, Fort Benning, Georgia.  Graduating in June 1932, he was ordered to duty at the Marine Corps Schools, Quantico, Virginia, as an instructor in the Company Officers' Course. In September 1933, he was named assistant operations officer of the 7th Marine Regiment at Quantico.

Smith sailed for France in January 1934, where he joined the staff of the American Embassy in Paris for duty with the Office of the U.S. Naval Attaché. From November 1934 to July 1936, while in Paris, he became the first Marine Corps officer to matriculate at the Ecole Supérieure de Guerre.

He returned to the United States in August 1936, and joined the staff of the Marine Corps Schools at Quantico, as an instructor in the S-3 Section, (Operations and Training). He acquired the nickname "the professor," gained a reputation as an intellectual during these years and was recognized as an expert on amphibious warfare.

Smith was transferred to the West Coast in July 1939, where he joined the Fleet Marine Force as operations officer at the Marine Corps Base, San Diego, California.

In June of the following year, he became commanding officer of the 1st Battalion, 6th Marines, and in May 1941, sailed with the 6th Marine Regiment for Iceland where he remained until returning to the United States in March 1942.

World War II
In May 1942, Smith was ordered to Headquarters Marine Corps, Washington, D.C., where he became executive officer of the Division of Plans and Policies. He remained in this capacity until January 1944, when he joined the 1st Marine Division on New Britain. There he took command of the 5th Marine Regiment and subsequently led the regiment in the Talasea phase of the Cape Gloucester operation.

In April 1944, he was named assistant division commander of the 1st Marine Division and participated in operations against the Japanese in the Peleliu operation during September and October 1944.

Smith became Marine deputy chief of staff of the Tenth Army in November 1944, and participated in the Battle of Okinawa from April through June 1945.

In July 1945, he returned to the United States and became commandant of the Marine Corps Schools, Quantico, and in January 1948, was named commanding general, Marine Barracks, Quantico, in addition to his duties at the school. Three months later, he became assistant commandant of the Marine Corps and chief of staff, Headquarters Marine Corps, Washington, D.C.  While there he served as editor-in-chief of the professional journal of U.S. Marines, the Marine Corps Gazette.

Korean War

Named Commanding General of the 1st Marine Division in June 1950, Major General Smith led his division through the bitter campaigns of the Korean War — from the late summer assault at Inchon, to the sub-zero winter drive north to the Chosin Reservoir.

In October 1950, the 1st Marine Division landed at Wonsan on the eastern side of Korea under the command of the Army's X Corps commanded by Edward Almond.  Almond and Smith shared a mutual loathing dating back to a meeting between the two in Japan before the Inchon landing. During the meeting Almond had spoken of how easy amphibious landings were although he had never planned, or taken part in one, and then referred to Smith as son although he was only 10 months older than Smith. Smith and the Marine command also felt Almond was too aggressive and were sure about large numbers of Chinese Forces in North Korea when higher headquarters in Tokyo was telling them that was not the case. Although ordered to go north to the Yalu River as fast as he could, Smith continuously slowed the division's march to the point of near insubordination. Also along the way he established supply points and an airfield.

In November 1950, with the 1st Marine Division surrounded at the Chosin Reservoir, he directed the breakout and subsequent  march to the seaport of Hungnam.  In the end his careful march north and ability to keep the division together saved it—and quite possibly the entire X Corps—from total destruction.

General Smith returned to the United States, in May 1951, and was assigned duties as commanding general, Marine Corps Base Camp Pendleton, California.

In July 1953, he was advanced to the rank of lieutenant general and assumed his final duties as commanding general, Fleet Marine Force, Atlantic, and served in this capacity until his retirement, with the rank of general, on September 1, 1955.

Smith died in Los Altos, California on December 25, 1977.

Awards

Distinguished Service Cross citation
Citation:

The President of the United States of America, under the provisions of the Act of Congress approved July 9, 1918, takes pleasure in presenting the Distinguished Service Cross to Major General Oliver P. Smith (MCSN: 0–920), United States Marine Corps, for extraordinary heroism in connection with military operations against an armed enemy of the United Nations while serving as Commanding General, FIRST Marine Division (Reinforced), in action against enemy aggressor forces in the vicinity of the Chosin Reservoir, Korea, from 29 November to 4 December 1950. Major General Smith's leadership contributed materially to the break-through in the Chosin Reservoir area and is in keeping with the highest traditions of the military service.

Silver Star citation
Citation:

The President of the United States of America, authorized by Act of Congress July 9, 1918, takes pleasure in presenting the Silver Star (Army Award) to Major General Oliver P. Smith (MCSN: 0–920), United States Marine Corps, for conspicuous gallantry and intrepidity in action as Commanding General, FIRST Marine Division (Reinforced), United Nations Command, in action against enemy aggressor forces in the Inchon-Seoul operation during the period 15 September to 21 September 1950. His actions contributed materially to the success of this operation and were in keeping with the highest traditions of the military service.

See also
 Battle of Chosin Reservoir

Notes

References

Books

Web

Further reading

External links
 

1893 births
1977 deaths
United States Marine Corps personnel of World War I
United States Marine Corps generals
United States Marine Corps World War II generals
American military personnel of the Banana Wars
United States Marine Corps personnel of the Korean War
Recipients of the Distinguished Service Cross (United States)
Recipients of the Navy Distinguished Service Medal
Recipients of the Distinguished Service Medal (US Army)
Recipients of the Silver Star
Recipients of the Legion of Merit
Recipients of the Air Medal
Commanders of the Order of Orange-Nassau
Order of National Security Merit members
University of California, Berkeley alumni
People from Menard County, Texas
Santa Cruz High School alumni
Military personnel from Texas